Mecyna indistinctalis is a moth in the family Crambidae. It was first described in 1961. It is found in Iran.

References

Moths described in 1961
Spilomelinae